The Shinbundang Line ; literally, New Bundang Line) or DX Line for Dynamic Express Line is a  long line of the Seoul Metropolitan Subway. It is the world's fifth subway to run completely driverless and the second completely driverless metro line to open in South Korea, after Busan Subway Line 4.

The initial route opened in October 2011 passed through 6 stations intersecting with three existing lines at Gangnam Station (Line 2), Yangjae Station (Line 3), and Jeongja Station (Bundang Line). Phase 2 opened on 30 January 2016 added 6 stations to the south, extending the line to serve Yongin's Suji-gu and Suwon's Gwanggyo New City. Construction for Phase 3's extension northwards to Sinsa station started in 2016, with opening on 28 May 2022. Construction of the line started in mid-2005, for revenue start in Sep 2011. However, because of the flooding of late July 2011, the opening was delayed and eventually opened on 28 October 2011.

Gwanggyo Jungang (Ajou Univ.) Station opened its underground bus transfer station in early March 2016, where screen doors are installed on bus platforms so bus riders from all over Suwon can transfer to the subway directly.

The price to ride the Shinbundang Line is higher than standard fare for the rest of the Seoul subway system. The minimum cost is currently 2,150 won to ride (base subway fare of 1,250 won along with a 900 won surcharge for using the line). If one crosses Jeongja Station, 200 won is charged on top of the 900 won extra charge.

Phases 

Phase 1 alleviated some of the traffic from inner Seoul to Bundang which is mainly residential and within the Seoul Capital Area. Travel from one end to the other was 16 minutes. Construction lasted for roughly six years starting in mid-2005 and ended at the end of October 2011. Total cost between public and private sectors was estimated at 1.169 trillion won.

Phase 2, a southern extension of the line, was primarily designed to ease heavy traffic between Yongin's Suji-gu and Bundang/Seoul, as Suji-gu was not a planned city like Bundang but abruptly and organically developed with large apartment complexes. As a result, Suji-gu is even more residential than Bundang, resulting in heavy traffic in connecting roads. The other aim was to connect the newly planned city of Gwanggyo rapidly to Seoul. Because of the investors and owners of Phase 1 and 2 being different, a 300 won extra charge was added on top of the 900 won extra charge if riders crossed Jeongja Station. Residents of Suji and Gwanggyo criticized the fare discrimination, despite a cashback being offered to frequent riders between Pangyo Station and Dongcheon/Suji-gu Office Station (200 won for Dongcheon and 100 won for Suji-gu Office). The mayor of Yongin and Suwon, along with officials from Gyeonggi-do asked the Ministry of Land, Infrastructure and Transport to lower the fares, which announced that it is trying to cut the fare by using low interest rate loans but it would take at least a year for it to be finalized.

There was a debate between Seongnam City and Suwon City regarding whether Migeum should be included in the Phase 2 extension of Shinbundang Line. They also argued that the inclusion of Migeum will alleviate traffic in the area. Meanwhile, the Suwon opposition claims that the inclusion would delay travel time to Gwanggyo, a planned area of Suwon in construction.

Phase 3, a northern extension of the line, will extend the line northwest of Gangnam to Yongsan Station. This additional stretch is estimated to cost at least 400 billion won. Because part of the line lies inside the Yongsan Garrison, the phase was split into two sections. One section, an extension from Gangnam to Sinsa, began construction in 2016 and was opened on May 28, 2022. The other section, a further extension from Sinsa to Yongsan, will start construction and will open no earlier than 2027.

Phase 4, a further extension of the line, will extend the line southwest to Suwon's Homaesil and Hwaseo Station. It will be constructed in the 2020s and open no earlier than 2027.

An additional consideration is to push the line north beyond Yongsan Station and end around Gwanghwamun Station and Gyeongbokgung Station, making it easier for commuters to access Gangnam from the central business district of Seoul. It was unclear if this idea has been scrapped or pushed back for a later reevaluation but resurfaced as a March 2012 campaign promise by Hong Sa-duk to expand the line near Gyeongbokgung Station.

Operation 
From Gangnam Station, trains are available from 05:30 until 24:50 on weekdays, cut to 23:48 on weekends and public holidays. However, the last train to Gwanggyo departs at 24:26 on weekdays, cut to 23:48 on weekends, with the remainder going until Jeongja Station only.

The trains are automated and run every 5 minutes during peak times to 8 minutes during off-peak hours. The SBL Line signal system is based on state-of-the-art communications-based train control (CBTC) technology, utilizing two-way digital radio communications between intelligent trains, and wayside equipment, and a network of ATS/ATO computers designed for very high system reliability and availability. Platforms can accommodate 10-car trains at  but initially 6-car trains will be used.

Stations

Current line

Yongsan extension and Samsong extension proposal 
Although initially planned to be opened simultaneously with the Sinsa-Gangnam extension, due to the extension from Sinsa to Yongsan potentially sharing tracks with the newly approved GTX A line towards Ilsan, construction on this section has been delayed. The stations' locations will be determined when the Yongsan Garrison moves out and the freed space becomes a public park. Current call for the line to split at Dongbinggo to Noksapyeong Station, Seoul Station, City Hall Station, Gwanghwamun Station, Gyeongbokgung Station, terminating at Samsong Station in Goyang. However, the Yongsan extension will begin construction earlier than the Samsong extension, as the latter has not been evaluated yet.

Homaesil extension and Bongdam extension proposal
The southwestern extension to Homaesil passed the economic feasibility research in late 2019. It is expected that construction will begin in 2023, with opening potentially in 2027, given that construction usually take 5 years to complete. A further extension to Hwaseong City's Bongdam has been proposed but not evaluated yet.

See also 
 Subways in South Korea
 Seoul Metropolitan Subway

References

External links

 Shinbundang's Official Website
 UrbanRail.net's Seoul Subway page
 Future Rail Database 
 Phase 2 Construction Information Website 

 
Seoul Metropolitan Subway lines
Bundang
Railway lines opened in 2011
25 kV AC railway electrification